Winkelhock is a German surname. Notable people with the surname include:

Joachim Winkelhock (born 1960), German racing driver
Manfred Winkelhock (1951–1985), German racing driver
Markus Winkelhock (born 1980), German racing driver
Thomas Winkelhock (born 1968), German racing driver

German-language surnames